Pettredutha Pillai is a Tamil film released in 1993 directed by Poornachandran, with camera, lyrics, music and story by T. Rajendar. The film starred Saravanan and Chitra with an extensive cast, which also featured Rajendar's two sons, Silambarasan and Kuralarasan. The film released on 10 April 1993.

Cast
 Saravanan as Saravanan
 Chitra
 Rohini as Vaidehi
 Pandiyan
 Silambarasan as Kumaran (Kumar)
 Mohankumar
 Sithara as Kalyani
 Vennira Aadai Moorthy
 Vadivukkarasi
 Ganthimathi
 Vasuki
 Kumarimuthu
 Kuralarasan
 Ponnambalam

Soundtrack 
Soundtrack was composed by T. Rajender who also wrote lyrics for all songs.
Komatha - Chithra
Paattu onnu - Chithra
Pethavale - Chithra
Petha Manam - K. J. Yesudas

Reception
The Indian Express wrote "Petredutha Pillai [..] has all trappings of a T. Rajender film. The treatment is not very subtle, the artistes over react and the film is prosy."

References

1993 films
1990s Tamil-language films
Indian drama films
Films scored by T. Rajendar
Films with screenplays by T. Rajendar